María Luisa Seco Lumbreras (June 1, 1948 – April 22, 1988) was a Spanish television presenter.

Spanish television presenters
1948 births
1988 deaths